This is a list of Billboard magazine's Top Hot 100 songs of 2001.

See also
2001 in music
List of Billboard Hot 100 number-one singles of 2001
List of Billboard Hot 100 top-ten singles in 2001

References

2001 record charts
Billboard charts